Maria Christina "Tina" A. Astorga is a theologian and professor at the Theology Department in University of Portland. She served as chair and Professor of Theology Department in Ateneo De Manila University.

Education
She received her B.A. from College of the Holy Spirit Manila. Also her Ph.D. and M.A. from the Loyola School of Theology in Ateneo de Manila University.

Academic career

Timeline
She became an instructor for the College of the Holy Spirit Manila from 1972 to 1979. 
Professor and Chairperson of Theology Department at Ateneo de Manila University from 1994 to 2003. 
Fellow at the Jesuit Institute in Boston College and Woodstock Theological Center in Georgetown University. 
Visiting Professor at the University of San Diego, Canisius College, and Gonzaga University 
Currently serving as a chairperson and professor at the Theology Department of University of Portland.

Personal life
Astorga was originally from Philippines. She said if she had never been in theology field, she would have been a lawyer or interior designer. She's a fan of cooking.

She moved to the United States in 2003, after she was granted a sabbatical leave.

As a Catholic theologian, she was known for being an outspoken critic of the Duterte government.

Books
 Catholic Moral Theology and Social Ethics: A New Method
 The Beast, the Harlot and the Lamb: Faith Confronts Systemic Evil

References

External links
 Theology without Borders - Matters of Life and Death: Social Thought and Eschatology, Berkley Center for Religion, Peace and World Affairs; Georgetown University, 31 March 2017

Filipino women academics
Filipino Roman Catholic theologians
Filipino feminists
Year of birth missing (living people)
Living people